Cinematograph or kinematograph is an early term for several types of motion picture film mechanisms. The name was used for movie cameras as well as film projectors, or for complete systems that also provided means to print films (such as the Cinématographe Lumière).

History

A device by this name was invented and patented as the "Cinématographe Léon Bouly" by French inventor Léon Bouly on February 12, 1892. Bouly coined the term "cinematograph," from the Greek for "writing in movement." Due to a lack of money, Bouly could not develop his ideas properly and maintain his patent fees, so  the Lumière brothers were free to adopt the name. In 1895, they applied it to a device that was mostly their own invention.

The Lumière brothers made their first film, Workers Leaving the Lumière Factory (Sortie de l'usine Lumière de Lyon), that same year. The first commercial, public screening of cinematographic films happened on 20 May 1895 at 156 Broadway, New York City, when the "Eidoloscope", invented by Woodville Latham and Eugene Lauste was presented. Nonetheless, this has often been incorrectly attributed to the first Lumière show on 28 December 1895 at Salon Indien du Grand Café in Paris, which was organised by the Lumière brothers. This presentation featured ten short films, including a new version of Workers Leaving the Lumiere Factory. Each of these early films was 17 meters long (approximately 56 feet), which, when hand cranked through a projector, ran approximately 50 seconds.

Invention

Louis Lumière and his brother Auguste worked together to create a motion-picture camera superior to Thomas Edison's kinetograph, which did not have a projector. The Lumières endeavored to correct the flaws they perceived in the kinetograph and the kinetoscope, to develop a machine with both sharper images and better illumination. The Cinématographe weighed only , which allowed for ease of transportation and placement. As well, the Cinématographe was manually operated by a hand-crank, as opposed to Edison's electrically powered camera, which was not readily portable. Furthermore, while only one person at a time could use Edison's kinetoscope for viewing through an eyepiece-- an early model of a viewfinder. The Cinématographe could project an image onto a screen so a large audience of people could view images simultaneously.

The Cinématographe produced a sharper projected image than had been seen before due to its design, in which a kind of fork held frames behind the lens in place using the perforations in the sides of the film strip.

In 1897, the Lumières further added to their invention by using a glass flask of water as the condenser to concentrate the light onto the film frame and to absorb heat. The flask also acted as a safety feature, as the light would no longer focus on the flammable film if the glass were to break due to overheating or accident.

Popularity
After the success of the Lumières's initial public screening in 1895, the Cinématographe became a popular attraction for people all over the world. The Lumière brothers took their machine to China and India and it was enjoyed by people of all classes and social standings. The Cinématographe was used to show films in nickelodeons, where even the poorest classes could pay the entry fee. It was exhibited at fairs and used as entertainment in vaudeville houses in both Europe and the United States. While vaudeville is typically associated with the working and middle classes, the machine also found its way into more sophisticated venues, where it appealed to the artistic tastes of high society.

See also
 Bioscop
 Biograph
 Electrotachyscope
 Film
 Image
 Kinetoscope
 List of film formats
 Panoptikon
 Pleograph
 Praxinoscope
 Vitascope
 Zoopraxiscope

Notes

Explanatory notes

References 

Ang, Tom. 2019. Photography: History, Art, Technique, 2005-2019.

External links

 Adventures in Cybersound
 
 

Audiovisual introductions in 1895
Auguste and Louis Lumière
History of film